Jørn Kjær is a Danish football former footballer and equipement manager who was last known to be equipment manager of FCM.

Career

Kjær started his playing career with Danish top flight side Horsens. After that, he signed for FCM in Denmark. In 2004, he returned to Danish club FCM as equipment manager.

Personal life

Kjær is the father of Denmark international Simon Kjær.

References

AC Horsens players
Danish men's footballers
FC Midtjylland players
Living people